The Global Facility Management Association (Global FM) is a federation of facilities management associations. It shares knowledge and understanding of facility management.

History and operations
Global FM has the following objectives:
 Assisting countries with formation of their own facilities management association.
 Encouraging collaboration between facilities management associations.
 Recognizing excellence in facility management.

Launched in 2009, Global FM sponsors an annual "World FM Day", also known as World Facilities Management Day.

Member organizations
Global FM is operated by a board of directors representing its member associations, which include:

 Associaçăo Brasileira de Facilities (ABRAFAC)
 European Facility Management Network (EuroFM)
 Facility Management Association of Australia (FMA)
 Facilities Management Association of New Zealand (FMANZ)
 Hungarian Facility Management Society (HFMS)
 Institute of Workplace and Facilities Management (IWFM) (formerly BIFM) 
 International Facility Management Association (IFMA) (United States and Canada)
 Middle East Facility Management Association (MEFMA)
 South African Facilities Management Association (safma)
 Turkish Facility Management Association (TRFMA)

References 

International professional associations